South Korean singer and member of SS501, Kim Kyu-jong has released 2 EPs, 5 singles, 6 soundtrack contribution songs, 1 collaboration song, and 5 DVDs.

During 2005-2010, Kim has had three solo songs from SS501 albums: "Hikari" from Kokoro, "Never Let You Go" from U R Man, and "Wuss Up" from SS501 Solo Collection. In 2009, he contributed a soundtrack from Bad Girl OST named "Lonely Girl" with Kim Hyung-jun.

On September 27, 2011 he released his debut solo mini album, Turn Me On with "Yesterday" as its title track. It also features rap by fellow member Heo Young-saeng in dance track "My Love", and Yang Jiwon of Spica in Yesterday music video. The teaser video for "Yesterday" was released on September 22.

On July 18, Kim released a limited edition mini-album Meet Me Again dedicated to his fans before his enlistment. It features three tracks including "Thank You" composed by Kim, himself and "One Luv", a duet with Mighty Mouth's Shorry J, composed by Tae Wan Kim aka C-Luv.

Extended plays

Singles

As featured artist

Soundtrack contributions

Video albums

Videography

Music videos

Others

Production credits

Concerts/Major Fan meetings

The following is an incomplete list of Kim Kyu-jong's concerts, major fanmeetings, and tours.

See also
 SS501 discography
 Kim Hyun-joong discography
 Heo Young-saeng discography
 Park Jung-min discography
 Kim Hyung-jun discography

References

External links
 
 
 
 

SS501
Discographies of South Korean artists
Pop music discographies